Hans Agbo (born 26 September 1967) is a Cameroonian football coach and former international player who is the assistant coach of Algerian club MC Oran.

Career
Agbo, a defender, played club football in Cameroon for Prévoyance Yaoundé, Olympic Mvolyé and Tonnerre Yaoundé.

Agbo represented Cameroon at the 1994 FIFA World Cup, making three appearances in the tournament. He also played at the 1992 African Cup of Nations and the 1996 African Cup of Nations.

Agbo became the assistant coach of Algerian Ligue Professionnelle 1 club MC Oran in July 2012.

References

Living people
1967 births
Footballers from Douala
Association football defenders
Cameroonian footballers
Cameroon international footballers
1994 FIFA World Cup players
1992 African Cup of Nations players
1996 African Cup of Nations players
Tonnerre Yaoundé players